Callitetrarhynchus is a genus of flatworms belonging to the family Lacistorhynchidae.

The species of this genus are found in Australia and America.

Species:

Callitetrarhynchus gracilis 
Callitetrarhynchus speciosus

References

Platyhelminthes